WBUY-TV (channel 40) is a religious television station licensed to Holly Springs, Mississippi, United States, serving the Memphis, Tennessee area as an owned-and-operated station of the Trinity Broadcasting Network (TBN). The station's studios are located on Cazassa Road in the southeast section of Memphis, and its transmitter is located in the Brunswick section of unincorporated northeast Shelby County.

History

WBUY first signed on the air in September 1991 as an affiliate of the Home Shopping Network (HSN); the last three letters of the station's call sign incidentally reflected this affiliation. In 1993, the station was sold to Mobile, Alabama-based Sonlight Broadcasting and became a TBN affiliate, carrying most of the network's schedule while opting out at times to air alternate programming. In 2001, WBUY was acquired by TBN and began airing the network full-time.

Subchannels

See also
List of television stations in the United States

References

External links

BUY-TV
Trinity Broadcasting Network affiliates
Television channels and stations established in 1991
1991 establishments in Mississippi
Holly Springs, Mississippi